Bedford Historic District is a national historic district located at Bedford, Virginia. The district encompasses 208 contributing buildings in two residential neighborhoods of Bedford, known locally as the Old Avenel area and the Longwood Avenue area.

The buildings are in a variety of 19th- and early 20th-century architectural styles.  Notable buildings include Chestnut, Winthrop, the Thomas L. Leftwich House, Liberty Presbyterian Church (1844), John Wharton House (1848), Burks-Guy House (1884), Charles W. Wharton House (now the Bedford Children's Library), the Harrison Building (1878), George L. Colgate House (1892), Bedford Masonic Hall (1895), Citizens Bank Building (Bedford, Virginia), Bedford High School (1928), Bedford County Courthouse (1930), Bedford Elementary School (1912), Main Street Methodist Church (1880s), and St. John's Episcopal Church (1923). Avenel (1836) and the John D. Ballard House (1915) are separately listed.

The District was listed on the National Register of Historic Places in 1984.

See also
National Elks Home in Bedford, Virginia

References

National Register of Historic Places in Bedford, Virginia
Historic districts on the National Register of Historic Places in Virginia